Toulouse-Montaudran Airport is a former French airport located in the district of Montaudran in the municipality of Toulouse in the Haute-Garonne department of the region of Occitanie.

History 

Created in 1917 by Pierre-Georges Latécoère, it became a centre for civil aviation and the aeronautics industry. In 1918 "Lignes Aériennes Latécoère" was created, and in 1927 it became the departure point for Aéropostale with pilots based at the airport including Jean Mermoz, Henri Guillaumet, Paul Vachet and Antoine de Saint-Exupéry.

Latécoère, successor to Aéropostale, until the 1970s Breguet, used the airport for repairs to their aircraft. Eventually, Air France Industries used the site for maintenance of their aircraft until 18 December 2003, 18, the date the last flight left the airport.

See also 
Montaudran Aerospace
L'Aéropostale, courrier du ciel
List of airports in France
Directorate General for Civil Aviation (France)
Montaudran
Groupe Latécoère
Aéroport de Francazal

References

Further reading 
 Gérard Rey, Toulouse-Montaudran, de Latécoère à Air France, Toulouse, Loubatières, 2003
 Georges Baccrabère, Toulouse terre d'envol, Toulouse, Privat, 1966 /Toulouse, Signes du monde, 1993 (2 vol.)
 Raymond Danel, Les lignes Latécoère (1918–1927), Toulouse, Privat, 1986
 Raymond Danel, L'Aéropostale (1927–1933), Toulouse, Privat, 1989

External links 
 Site of Toulouse - Montaudran
 Historic planes

Toulouse - Montaudran
Airports established in 1917
Buildings and structures in Haute-Garonne
Toulouse - Montaudran